St. Jude Catholic Church is a Catholic parish of the Diocese of Dallas. It is located in Allen, Texas. The first Catholic church in the city of Allen, it was established in 1981. This parish was created with 50 founding members, including organizer Don Rodenbaugh. A new sanctuary was opened in 2005.

History
A small band of interested men and women from Allen, Fairview and Lucas came together in 1980 to consider the possibility of establishing a Catholic Mission in the city of Allen. After countless hours of legwork and paperwork, Bishop Thomas Tschoepe granted them permission to begin this journey.

The first public Mass of the newly formed St. Jude Catholic Community was offered at Rountree Elementary School on Sunday, July 5, 1981. It was originally established as a mission chapel of St. Michael’s in McKinney, then later reassigned to St. Mark’s in Plano. It was served on alternate Sundays by Rev. David Fellhauer (now, Bishop of Victoria) and Rev. Duffy Gardner (now, Monsignor, retired).

In 1981, St. Mark’s donated 10 acres of land in Allen. An architect was hired to design a temporary parish facility in 1983. Fr. Tom Cloherty was assigned as the first pastor of St. Jude on August 1, 1983. Daily Masses were offered above the feedstore in Downtown Allen until the completion of the first building project.  On November 3, 1984, we said our first Mass in our new church facility.

In 1989, we began construction on the Religious Education building. The religious education classes and Rainbow Days Preschool (founded in 1985), had been operating in the classrooms which now serve as offices. During this phase of construction, Fr. Tom was transferred to Holy Spirit in Duncanville; Fr. Bruce Bradley came to us from St. Elizabeth in Bonham. In 1998, an additional 10-acres of land adjacent to our property was purchased from the diocese. Fr. Bruce remained the pastor of St. Jude until 1999, when he was transferred to Mary Immaculate in Farmers Branch.

In 1999, Fr. Tim Church was assigned as priest-in-charge of St. Jude. We had already begun using the Activity Center as overflow for the larger Masses. Between 2000 - 2005, the population of Allen boomed, and we added 1,000 new families. Within 18 months of Fr. Tim’s arrival, the existing mortgages were retired, and a building committee was formed. We broke ground on our new sanctuary a year ahead of schedule on July 3, 2004.

Bishop Charles Grahmann dedicated the new permanent Church on November 12, 2005. In 2007, St. Jude purchased the adjacent 7.2 acres to the south to provide for future expansion of our campus.

In 2008, the first of two columbariums was added between the church and the chapel on the eastern transept.

In 2012, we expanded the transepts to add an additional 300+ seats, making the distance of each transept equal to the distance of the nave. This feature was designed into the original building to support the future growth of the parish. The increased seating required increase parking, so another 88 parking spaces were added off Greenville Avenue along with a circle drive. The pastoral center the parish staff now occupies was also added during this phase of construction.

Bishop Farrell petitioned the Vatican for Fr. Tim to be designated Pastor of St. Jude. This is an extraordinary exception to the Pastoral Provision for a married priest. In August 2012, Fr. Tim Church officially became the Pastor of St. Jude.

On April 1, 2016, Fr. Tim Church became Pastor Emeritus and Fr. Andrew Semler was named pastor of St. Jude.

Community outreach
With the recession of 2008, St. Jude Catholic Church formed a "Career Alliance" outreach to assist those who in the community who lost their jobs find meaningful employment.  Volunteers in the parish offered their services to review resumes, teach interview skills, networking and the use of online tools.  This outreach was so well received at St. Jude that it was opened up to other parishes in the Diocese and rebranded as the "North Texas Catholic Career Development Community".  Fourteen area churches joined with St. Jude to host an online jobs database.  They hold weekly brownbag networking lunches, and monthly seminars with industry leaders as guest speakers.

The People Helping People team at St. Jude that reaches out to the community, discovering needs, and bringing them to the parish for assistance.  In the past they have served Refuge Empowerment Services (a division of Catholic Charities), the Children's Advocacy Center, Hope's Door, My Friend's House, the White Rose Crisis Pregnancy Center, The Juliette Fowler Home, The Clyde W. Cooper Veteran's Home in Bonham, TX, Habitat for Humanity, and provide visitation to nursing homes and rehab facilities in the area.  They also host and facilitate health fairs to provide low cost immunizations for children.  They sponsor the Title 1 elementary schools in Allen as well.

St. Jude provides an outreach ministry to the teens at Collin County Juvenile Detention Center in McKinney, Texas, housing between 95-110 youth, ages 11–17. St. Jude provides both worship services and life skills training, including resume and cover sheet generation, job interview techniques, financial planning, and career guidance.

"12-Step Meetings" are offered each Saturday morning as a part of their Alcohol and Addiction Ministries.

Works of art
Allen native Andy Buchanan was commissioned to create his artistic interpretation of the renowned Giotto fresco, "Jesus Washes the Feet of the Apostles".  This  mural is in the arch above the main doors to the church.  Buchanan was also commissioned to recreated the San Damiano Cross for the Chapel of the Blessed Mother Teresa at St. Jude.

Seattle artist Cody Harrington was commissioned to create 14 original works of art for the sanctuary known as the Stations of the Cross, or Via Dolorosa.  The photo-realistic, pencil sketches were inspired by the 2004 Mel Gibson film, The Passion of the Christ. The stained glass in the flying roof and transepts are by Cavallini of San Antonio, Texas. The wood carved statues and crucifix are by Ferdinando Perathoner of Ortisei, Italy.

References

External links
Official website

Churches in the Dallas–Fort Worth metroplex
Roman Catholic churches in Texas
Buildings and structures in Allen, Texas
Churches in Collin County, Texas
Christian organizations established in 1981
1981 establishments in Texas